is a Japanese private railway operating company based in western Hyōgo Prefecture. It runs local and express rail service between Himeji and Kobe, and also connects directly with Hanshin Main Line to Osaka.

Although the Hanshin Electric Railway Co. (which owns the Hanshin Main Line) is its largest shareholder, the company is not a member of the Hankyu Hanshin Toho Group.

Train lines
Main Line: Nishidai Station (Kobe) - Shikama Station - Sanyo Himeji Station (54.7 km)
Aboshi Line: Shikama Station - Sanyo Aboshi Station (8.5 km)

Rolling stock
, the company owns and operates the following train types.

 3000 series three- and four-car EMUs
 5000 series four- and six-car EMUs
 5030 series six-car EMUs
 6000 series three-car EMUs (since April 2016)

New three-car 6000 series EMUs were introduced on 27 April 2016.

Buses
Sanyo also operates bus service in Kobe (mainly Tarumi-ku) and Akashi.

Aerial lift
Sumaura Ropeway

References

External links

Transport in Kobe
Railway companies of Japan
Companies based in Kobe
1933 establishments in Japan